Rossington is a civil parish in the Metropolitan Borough of Doncaster in South Yorkshire, England.

Rossington may also refer to:

People
Adam Rossington (born 1993), English cricketer 
Gary Rossington (1951–2023), American musician and songwriter
Jane Rossington (born 1943), British actress
Norman Rossington (1928–1999), English actor

Other uses
Rossington, Alberta, Canada, unincorporated community
Rossington railway station, in South Yorkshire, England

See also